Junaid Khan (born as Junaid Khan Niazi 2 November 1981) is a Pakistani actor, producer and singer-songwriter. 

Since the early 2000s he's the lead vocalist of the Lahore-based rock band Call, which has released two commercially successful albums, Jilawatan and Dhoom. 

As an actor he's best known for his roles in serials Sun Yaara (2017), Ishq Tamasha (2018) and Yaariyan (2019), . He rose to fame by portraying the sophisticated and sober character of Dr. Talal Sikandar in the 2017 hit drama Sun Yaara on Ary Digital.

In 2012 Khan was nominated at the Lux Style Awards in two different categories Best TV Actor for the serial Dil Ki Lagi and Best Album of the Year for the album Dhoom.

In 2022 he turned producer with Jeem Films, a production house and company he considers to be a platform to promote new talent.

Early life
Junaid Khan Niazi was born on 2 November 1981 to a Muslim family of Pashtun descent in Multan, Punjab, Pakistan. 

Khan completed his early education (grades 1 to 5) from Divisional Public School and from Ibne Sina College Defence (Matric). After completing Matric, he joined FC College and later joined Mining Engineering Department of UET Lahore to pursue a degree in Engineering. During his third year at UET, while still being a student, Khan started his musical career. He was auditioned by former Call members and was chosen to be part of the band. Later Khan earned his Master of Business Administration (MBA) degree from Imperial College in Lahore. 

He, along with Khurram Jabbar Khan and Sultan Raja, were Call band members at that time. Later on Khan brought in two guitarists, Farooq Nasir and Usman Nasir, in the band. Soon the band released their first track, "Nishaan", which went viral on the internet and soon Call was amongst the mainstream artists of the country. Soon after, the band released their first music video of the song "Pukaar".

Soon the band started performing live at various event throughout Pakistan and also internationally. Khan and Farooq Nasir composed the album Jilawatan and were recording at Xulfiqar Jabbar Khan's (member of the band Entity Paradigm at time) audio studio in Lahore. Later on Farooq and Usman Nasir left the band due to their personal commitments and Khan asked Xulfiqar Jabbar Khan to enter the band as the lead guitarist. The band completed the production of the album and Jilawatan was completed around 2005.

Explaining his transition to acting which happened later in his career, he says that having an artist mother who's a gold medallist in Fine Arts, he himself indulged in artistic activities during his student days, namely drawing and theatre, the latter serving as base for his future as actor.

Career

With Call
Khan wrote his first rock ballad, "Sab Bhulla Kay", in 2005. The band released the album Jilawatan with the song during the same year. 

The band released the album with the video of the punk rock track "Main Esa Hi Hoon". Khan released another song, "Badal do Zamana", with Pepsi for the T20 World Cup in 2010. Later, he appeared in the play titled Kabhi Na Kabhi, the soundtrack of which was also composed by Khan. He played the lead in another serial from the same production house, and he was later cast by Moomal Productions as the lead in Mata-e-Jaan Hai Tu, Sanam Saeed, Sarwat Gillani,  Yahan Pyar Nahi Hai, Saba Qamar, and Mawra Hussain in early 2012. For his work in Dil Ki Lagi, he was nominated for the Best TV Actor (Terrestrial) in Lux Style Award, which took place in late 2012.

Khan signed two more serials with Moomal Productions, Madiha Maliha and Qadoorat. The first is currently on air and the second is under production. He started working on a solo album and released his first solo track, "So Close So Distant". At the end of 2012, Khan decided to depart from Call to seek a solo career in music.

Solo music
In 2011, while he was about to go to New York for the shoot of Mata-e-Jaan Hai Tu, Khan collaborated with American singer Jennifer Jandris. Khan composed and produced the track, and shot the video with Jandris in Washington DC around late 2011. The track was released on Valentine's Day in 2012. In 2021, he released his new solo track "Taqdeer". The lyrics and composition of the song is Khan himself.

Discography

Albums with Call
 "Jilawatan" (2005)
 "Dhoom" (2011)

Coke Studio 
 "Mein Raasta" Duet along with Momina Mustehsan (season 9).

Music videos
 "Nishaan" (2003) from Jilawatan
 "Pukaar" (2003) from Jilawatan
 "Shayad" (2004) from Jilawatan
 "Sab Bhula Kai" (2005) from Jilawatan
 "Bichar Kai Bhee" (2006) from Jilawatan
 "Kuch Naheen" (2006) from Jilawatan
 "Kal Hamara Hai" (2006)
 "Hum Se Hai Yeh Zamaana" (2007) from Dhoom
 "Aasmaan" (2007) from Dhoom
 "Ho Jaane De" (2009) from Dhoom
 "Main esa hi hoon" (2011) from Dhoom
 "So close So distant" (2012)
 "Taqdeer" (2021)

Television OST 
 "Marzi" (2016)
 "Sun Yaara" (2017)
 "Thays" (2018)

Filmography

Television

Film

Accolades

References

External links
 
 
 

1981 births
Living people
Pakistani male singers
Pakistani composers
Pakistani male television actors
Pashtun people
Forman Christian College alumni
University of Engineering and Technology, Lahore alumni
Pakistani film actors
Pakistani male singer-songwriters